Faraz Ahmed (born 16 October 1984) is a Pakistani first-class cricketer who plays for Karachi cricket team. In November 2017, he was selected to play for the Quetta Gladiators in 2018 Pakistan Super League players draft.

References

External links
 

1984 births
Living people
Pakistani cricketers
Karachi cricketers
Cricketers from Karachi
Quetta Gladiators cricketers